Mom and Dad is a 2017 comedy horror film written and directed by Brian Taylor. Starring Nicolas Cage and Selma Blair, the film premiered at the 2017 Toronto International Film Festival, and was theatrically released on January 19, 2018 by Momentum Pictures. A joint British and American production, the film underperformed at the box office but received generally positive reviews from critics.

Plot
A mother in a suburban town puts on music for her child as she sets her car on railroad tracks and leaves the child in the car to die.

The Ryans are a family of four with a strained relationship. Brent, the father, does not approve of his daughter Carly's new boyfriend Damon. He is also going through a slight mid-life crisis that has him working on his sportscar in the garage. Carly considers her mother Kendall out of touch, fights with her younger brother Joshua, and is currently upset about canceling plans with her boyfriend because her grandparents are coming to visit. Kendall is trying to find hobbies that occupy her time such as taking fitness classes. She's also anticipating the delivery of her sister's new baby.

While Carly is at school, radios and TV screens suddenly start transmitting unexplained static. The effect is seen as the Ryans' housekeeper murders her own daughter in front of a terrified Joshua. Meanwhile, a mob of parents rushes to Carly's school to kill their children. When the students see one classmate being stabbed by his mother with her car keys after he scales a fence to reach her, the students scatterthough many die at the hands of their parents.

Carly escapes with her friend Riley. They reach Riley's house, where Carly watches television reports of the mass hysteria, confirming that the static is compelling parents across the country to slaughter their children; Dr. Oz is interviewed, telling people how it compares to savaging in pig populations. Upstairs, Riley's mother strangles her. Carly runs home in terror and finds Damon, whose father earlier tried to kill him with a broken bottle but accidentally cut his own throat. Damon accompanies Carly into the house to get Joshua somewhere safe.

Kendall goes to the hospital where her sister Jeannie is giving birth, but the static transmits on a delivery room monitor, causing Jeannie to attempt to kill her newborn daughter as Kendall tries to save her. Kendall escapes the hospital and heads home.

Seeing Carly at home with Damon, the hysteria overtakes Brent and he knocks Damon out and attacks Carly. Kendall joins him when she gets home. Carly and Joshua lock themselves in the basement and Brent and Kendall use a Sawzall to get through the door. Joshua pulls out Brent's gun and fires through the door, wounding his mother. Kendall and Brent, bonding over their shared filicidal desire, run a hose from their oven's natural gas line to the basement to poison the kids. When Carly sees what is happening, she rigs up a trap with matches at the door and hides with Joshua in the ventilation system. Brent cuts the lock off and opens the door, igniting the gas and triggering an explosion that knocks both parents out and awakens Damon.

Damon helps Carly and Joshua evade their parents, but Kendall awakens and knocks Damon out again. As the parents close in on their kids, the doorbell rings. When Brent opens the door, his own filicidal parentsMel and Barbaratry to kill him. Everyone chases one another through the house: Joshua evades Brent, who attempts to hide from his father in the garage; Kendall chases Carly and hits her on the head before her mother-in-law knocks her out.

Brent starts the car and crashes it, killing his parents and knocking himself out. Kendall prepares to finish Carly off, but Damon knocks her out with a shovel.

Kendall and Brent wake up to find themselves restrained in the basement with Carly, Joshua, and Damon watching them. They continue to exhibit symptoms of the hysteria, and the kids refuse to let them go. Kendall tearfully tells the children she loves them, and the film ends mid-sentence of Brent stating: "But sometimes we just want to—".

Cast

In addition, Mehmet Oz has a cameo appearance as himself.

Production
The film is a joint United Kingdom, United States production.

On February 12, 2016, Nicolas Cage was set to star in the film and June 22, 2016 saw Selma Blair sign on. Principal photography began in July 2016, and took place in Louisville, Kentucky.

Release
The film premiered in the Midnight Madness section at the 2017 Toronto International Film Festival on September 9, 2017, and was theatrically released by Momentum Pictures on January 19, 2018.

Reception

Box office
With a limited release, Mom and Dad grossed $286,313 at the box office, against a budget of $4 million.

Critical response
 

Adam White of The Daily Telegraph gave the 4/5 stars, saying that it was "Both a torrid exploitation cinema throwback, and a metaphor for a generation of kids screwed over by their elders." Tara Brady of The Irish Times also gave it 4/5 stars, writing: "Think back on the most unhinged screen moments of Nicolas Cage's career... Multiply all these scenes together and you still can't match the awesome lunacy of Nic Cage killing a pool table in the delightfully delirious Mom and Dad." Simran Hans of The Observer gave it 3/5 stars, writing: "Almost ugly ultra-HD, a dated dubstep soundtrack and ketchup-splatter special effects might make a lesser film less appealing, but here these lowbrow touches work to Mom and Dad's advantage." Bruce DeMara of the Toronto Star gave it 3.5/4 stars, calling it "a madly satisfying mélange of suspense and comedy, though perhaps not recommended for family viewing." Charlotte O'Sullivan of the Evening Standard called it "a hilarious, knowing bit of schlock about a plague that turns parents into predators", and wrote: "Mom and Dad is like Andrey Zvyagintsev's Loveless but with more dead people and far fewer trees."

Barry Hertz of The Globe and Mail gave it 1.5/4 stars, writing: "Nicolas Cage does crazy like no one else, but his descent into insanity here - not too far from how his character acts at the beginning of the film, really - can't elevate Taylor's juvenile take on adulthood." Kevin Maher of The Times gave it 2/5 stars, saying that its social satire was "briefly compelling", but added: "The 'joke' soon wears thin, however, and the film, with few actual ideas to express, resorts to slapdash plotting and dead-end gore." Rex Reed of The New York Observer gave it 0/4 stars, writing: "With an agonizing rupture of craft and common sense, it showcases a performance of screaming, over-the-top hysteria by Nicolas Cage that must be seen to be fully believed, but that is not a recommendation."

Director John Waters named the film as the fourth best of 2018.

References

External links
 
 

2017 films
2017 comedy horror films
2017 independent films
2010s English-language films
American comedy horror films
American independent films
British comedy horror films
British independent films
Filicide in fiction
Films shot in Louisville, Kentucky
Vertigo Films films
2010s American films
2010s British films